This article lists the confirmed national futsal squads for the 1989 FIFA Futsal World Championship tournament held in Netherlands, between 5 and 15 January, 1989.

Group A

Head coach: Ron Groenewoud

Head coach: Richard Møller Nielsen

Head coach: Lourenco Garcia

Head coach: Amar Rouaï

Group B

Head coach: József Tajti

Head coach: Gerson Tristão

Head coach: Muhammad Al Kahrashi

Head coach: Teodoro Nieto

Group C

Head coach: Masakatsu Miyamoto

Head coach: Claudy Blaise

Head coach: Bob Lenarduzzi

Head coach: Vicente de Luise

Group D

Head coach: Enzo Trombetta

Head coach: Nico Sprey

Head coach: John Kowalski

Head coach: Tim White

External links

FIFA Futsal World Cup squads
Squads